Stanley Watts may refer to:
Stan Watts (1911–2000), American basketball 
Stanley J. Watts (born 1961), American artist and sculptor